Basic Education High School No. 2 Dagon (formerly, Myoma National High School, မြို့မကျောင်း) is a public high school located a few miles north of downtown Yangon, Myanmar. The former nationalist high school founded for the children of the common folk, now educates mostly the children of well-to-do Burmese families from Dagon and vicinity. It was one of the first "nationalist schools" opened after the First National Strike against the British rule in Burma.

History
The Myoma school was founded in Bahan township in December 1920. The school is regarded as the first nationalist school opened in Burma as it was established in 1920. The school was founded as the Myoma National High School by Ba Lwin after Pho Latt and Ngwe Zin. The current building was built in 1929 as part of a nationwide movement by the nationalist Burmese to counter what they perceived as drawbacks of the British colonial education system: lack of access, and a heavily biased curriculum.

The colonial education system relied heavily on a small number of private (mostly parochial) schools like St. Paul's English High School that were out of reach for most Burmese. Even the wealthy Burmese who could afford the schools were unsatisfied with the heavy Anglo-centric nature of the curriculum. (This led to the First Yangon University Strike in December 1920. The event is still celebrated annually as National Day.) Throughout the 1920s, the nationalist Burmese set up a parallel education system of national schools throughout the country. In 1929, Ba Lwin founded the school in Yangon. He would go on to guide the school until 1953.

The school was nationalized in April 1965, and eventually renamed as Basic Education High School No. 2 Dagon. Today, commonly known as Dagon 2, it is still a nationally prominent school due to its heritage. Ironically, the very access touted in the school's founding has dissipated. Dagon 2 today draws its student body overwhelmingly from well-to-do families who can pay a large "donation" every year.

The school is listed on the Yangon City Heritage List. The Blue Plaque has been installed on the structure by the Yangon Heritage Trust in November 2018.

Notable alumni

Arts and literature

 Hsu Shin: Famous writer
 Ma Sandar: Famous writer
 Myoma Myint Kywe: Famous writer, historian and chief instructor of Soshiki Karate Academy 
 Zawgyi: Distinguished writer, poet and one of the leaders of the Khit-San literary movement in the 1930s

Business 

 Maung Shwe: Chairman of Myanmar–India Merchants' Association

Military 

 Rear-Adm. Chit Hlaing: former Commander-in-Chief (Navy)
 Lieutenant General Maung Hla: Minister
 General Kyaw Win (Dr. Kyaw Win): Director of Medical Services, Burma Army Medical Corp sand Retired Myanmar Ambassador to the Court of St. James
 Lieutenant General Phone Myint: Home Affairs Minister
 Major General Sein Htwa: Social welfare minister    
 Commodore Thaung Tin: Former Commander-in-Chief (Navy)
 Lieutenant General Thein Win: Commander in Chiefs and Chief of Air Staff

Politics and government

 Bo Letya: one of the Thirty Comrades; Commander-in-Chief of the Burma Defence Army (1943–45); War Minister (1944–45); Deputy prime minister (1948–52)
 Bo Mingaung: one of the Thirty Comrades
 U Nu: Prime Minister of Burma (1948–1956, 1957–1958, 1960–1962)
 Myoma U Than Kywe: One of the negotiators of the historical Panglong Conference in 1947. The signing of Panglong Agreement is now celebrated as a national holiday, Union Day.
 Ye Htoon: lawyer, political dissident 
 Bo Zeya: one of the Thirty Comrades
 Win Tin: Journalist and politician, Burmese Democracy activist

Religion 

 Sayadaw Vinaya: Monk, Abbot of Kaba-Aye Sunlun Meditation Monastery in Yangon

Science 

 Maung Maung Kha: Burma's first physicist;

Sports 

 Sein Hlaing: Most successful coach of Myanmar national football team; Winner of FIFA Centennial Order Merit Award.

List of principals
Pho Latt : 1920 (served as headmaster for a few months, vice-president of Rangoon University Students' Boycott Council in 1920)
Ngwe Zin : 1920–23
Ba Lwin : 1923–53
Aye Thwe : 1953–57
Ba Tin : 1957–68
Ba Saw : 1968–70
Hla Thein : 1970–72
Nyein Maung : 1972–82
Win Soe : 1982–84
Tin Win : 1985–88
Khin Maung Nyunt : 1988–90
Han Thein : 1990–97
Tha Win : 1998–99
Tin Hlaing : 1999–2002
Tin Maung Tun : 2002–2011
Aye Thinn : 2011–2016
Sai Ko Lay : 2016–2018
Ko Ko Naing : 2018–present

External links
 Official website

References

High schools in Yangon